The Czech Republic participated at the 2018 Summer Youth Olympics in Buenos Aires, Argentina from 6 October to 18 October 2018.

Medalists

Athletics

Badminton

The Czech Republic qualified one player based on the Badminton Junior World Rankings. 

Singles

Team

Basketball

The Czech Republic qualified a girls' team based on the U18 3x3 National Federation Ranking.

 Girls' tournament - 1 team of 4 athletes

Beach volleyball

The Czech Republic qualified a boys' team based on their performance at 2017-18 European Youth Continental Cup Final.

 Boys' tournament - 1 team of 2 athletes

Boxing

Canoeing

The Czech Republic qualified three boats based on its performance at the 2018 World Qualification Event.

 Boys' C1 - 1 boat
 Boys' K1 - 1 boat
 Girls' K1 - 1 boat

Cycling

The Czech Republic qualified a boys' combined team based on its ranking in the Youth Olympic Games Junior Nation Rankings. They also qualified a mixed BMX racing team based on its ranking in the Youth Olympic Games BMX Junior Nation Rankings and two athletes in BMX freestyle based on its performance at the 2018 Urban Cycling World Championship.

 Boys' combined team - 1 team of 2 athletes
 Mixed BMX racing team - 1 team of 2 athletes
 Mixed BMX freestyle - 1 boy and 1 girl

Fencing

Golf

Individual

Team

Gymnastics

Artistic
The Czech Republic qualified one gymnast based on its performance at the 2018 European Junior Championship.

 Boys' artistic individual all-around - 1 quota

Multidiscipline

Judo

Individual

Team

Roller speed skating

Rowing

The Czech Republic qualified one boat based on its performance at the 2017 World Junior Rowing Championships. The Czech Republic later qualified a single sculls boat based on its performance at the 2018 European Rowing Junior Championships.

 Boys' single sculls - 1 boat
 Girls' pair - 1 boat

Shooting

The Czech Republic qualified one sport shooter based on its performance at the 2018 European Championships. 

 Boys' 10m Air Pistol - 1 quota

Individual

Mixed

Swimming

Boys

Girls

Table tennis

Taekwondo

Tennis

Singles

Doubles

Weightlifting

References

2018 in Czech sport
Nations at the 2018 Summer Youth Olympics
Czech Republic at the Youth Olympics